Christian Davon Kirk (born November 18, 1996) is an American football wide receiver for the Jacksonville Jaguars of the National Football League (NFL). He played college football at Texas A&M, and was selected by the Arizona Cardinals in the second round of the 2018 NFL Draft.

High school career
Kirk attended Saguaro High School in Scottsdale, Arizona, where he played high school football. He played both wide receiver and running back for the Sabercats. He gained over 3,000 all-purpose yards as a senior and 2,000 as a junior. Kirk was rated by Rivals.com as a five-star recruit and was ranked among the top overall prospects in his class. He committed to Texas A&M University to play college football.

College career
Kirk attended and played college football at Texas A&M under head coach Kevin Sumlin. Kirk earned a starting job at receiver as a true freshman in 2015. In his first game, he had 6 receptions for 106 yards with a touchdown and also returned a punt 79 yards for a touchdown. As a freshman in 2015, Kirk played 13 games with 1,009 receiving yards and seven touchdowns. He also had two return touchdowns on 14 punt returns for 341 yards and 20 kickoff returns for 385 yards. As a sophomore in 2016, Kirk played 13 games with 928 receiving yards and nine touchdowns. He also had three return touchdowns on 13 punt returns for 282 yards and 6 kickoff returns for 173 yards. In 2017, as a junior, he played in 13 games, catching 71 passes for 919 yards and 10 touchdowns, along with one touchdown on 10 punt returns for 191 yards and one touchdown on 22 returns for 490 yards. After the season, Kirk declared for the 2018 NFL Draft.

Collegiate statistics

Professional career

Arizona Cardinals
Kirk was drafted by the Arizona Cardinals in the second round (47th overall) of the 2018 NFL Draft. He was the fifth wide receiver to be selected that year.

2018
In the Cardinals' season-opening loss to the Washington Redskins, Kirk had a four-yard reception to go along with two punt returns for 44 net yards in his NFL debut. In Week 3, he recorded a solid game with seven receptions for 90 yards in the 16–14 loss to the Chicago Bears. In Week 5 against the San Francisco 49ers, he caught a 75-yard touchdown bomb from fellow rookie Josh Rosen to help the Cardinals earn their first win of the season by a score of 28–18. He played in 12 games, starting seven, recording 43 receptions for 590 yards and three touchdowns. He suffered a broken foot in Week 13 and was placed on injured reserve on December 3, 2018.

2019

In Week 2 against the Baltimore Ravens, Kirk caught six passes for 114 yards as the Cardinals lost 23–17. In Week 10 against the Tampa Bay Buccaneers, Kirk caught 6 passes for 138 yards and three touchdowns in the 30–27 loss. Overall, Kirk finished the 2019 season with 68 receptions for 709 receiving yards and three receiving touchdowns.

2020
In Week 6 against the Dallas Cowboys on Monday Night Football, Kirk had two receptions for 86 receiving yards and two receiving touchdowns in the 38–10 victory. In the following game, a 37–34 overtime victory over the Seattle Seahawks on NBC Sunday Night Football, he again recorded two receiving touchdowns. In a Week 9 loss to the Miami Dolphins, he had five receptions for 123 receiving yards and one receiving touchdown. He was placed on the reserve/COVID-19 list by the Cardinals on January 2, 2021, and activated on January 13.
Overall, in the 2020 season, Kirk finished with 48 receptions for 621 receiving yards and six receiving touchdowns in 14 games.

2021
Kirk entered the 2021 season third on the Cardinals wide receiver depth chart. He finished the season as the Cardinals leading receiver with a career-high 77 catches for 982 yards and five touchdowns.

Jacksonville Jaguars

On March 16, 2022, Kirk signed a four-year, $72 million contract with the Jacksonville Jaguars. In his Jaguars debut, Kirk had six receptions for 117 yards in the 28–22 loss to the Washington Commanders. In the following game, he recorded two receiving touchdowns in the 24–0 victory over the Indianapolis Colts. In Week 10, against the Kansas City Chiefs, he had nine receptions for 105 yards and two touchdowns in the 27–17 loss.

NFL career statistics

Regular season

Personal life
On May 14, 2018, it was revealed that Kirk was arrested for disorderly conduct and causing property damage in Scottsdale, Arizona, which occurred on February 3, more than two months prior to the draft. Kirk allegedly threw rocks at cars while attending the Waste Management Phoenix Open at TPC Scottsdale. Kirk was deemed to be intoxicated during the incident. On May 29, 2018, all charges against Kirk were dropped.

References

External links

Jacksonville Jaguars bio
Texas A&M Aggies bio

1996 births
Living people
American football return specialists
American football wide receivers
Arizona Cardinals players
Jacksonville Jaguars players
Players of American football from Scottsdale, Arizona
Texas A&M Aggies football players